Georgia competed at the 2000 Summer Olympics in Sydney, Australia.

Medalists

Results by event

Archery

In its second Olympic archery competition, Georgia sent three women.  None won a match, and the trio lost their first match in the team round as well.

Women's team:
 Phutkaradze, Lorigi, and Diasamidze – Round of 16, 12th place (0-1)

Athletics

Men's 100m
 Ruslan Rusidze
 Round 1 – 10.7 (→ did not advance)

Women's 100m
 Tamara Shanidze
 Round 1 – 12.56 (→ did not advance)

Boxing

Men's Bantamweight (– 54 kg)
Theimuraz Khurtsilava
Round 1 – Defeated Aram Ramazyan of Armenia
Round 2 – Lost to Raimkul Malakhbekov of Russia (→ did not advance)

Men's Heavyweight (– 91 kg)
Vladimer Chanturia
Round 1 – Bye 
Round 2 – Defeated Amro Mostafa Mahmoud of Egypt
Quarterfinal – Defeated Ruslan Chagaev of Uzbekistan
Semifinal – Lost to Sultanahmed Ibzagimov of Russia – Bronze medal

Diving

Women's competition

Swimming

Men's competition

Weightlifting

Men

References

Wallechinsky, David (2004). The Complete Book of the Summer Olympics (Athens 2004 Edition). Toronto, Canada. . 
International Olympic Committee (2001). The Results. Retrieved 12 November 2005.
Sydney Organising Committee for the Olympic Games (2001). Official Report of the XXVII Olympiad Volume 1: Preparing for the Games. Retrieved 20 November 2005.
Sydney Organising Committee for the Olympic Games (2001). Official Report of the XXVII Olympiad Volume 2: Celebrating the Games. Retrieved 20 November 2005.
Sydney Organising Committee for the Olympic Games (2001). The Results. Retrieved 20 November 2005.
International Olympic Committee Web Site

Nations at the 2000 Summer Olympics
2000
Summer